Sun Yujie (born 10 August 1992) is a Chinese fencer. At 2012 Summer Olympics she won gold medal in team épée with Li Na, Luo Xiaojuan and Xu Anqi and a bronze in  Women's individual épée. She won the 2010–11 and 2011–12 World Cups.

References

1992 births
Living people
Chinese female fencers
Olympic fencers of China
Fencers at the 2012 Summer Olympics
Fencers at the 2016 Summer Olympics
Olympic gold medalists for China
2016 Olympic silver medalists for China
Olympic bronze medalists for China
Olympic medalists in fencing
Fencers from Liaoning
Sportspeople from Anshan
Medalists at the 2012 Summer Olympics
Asian Games medalists in fencing
Fencers at the 2010 Asian Games
Fencers at the 2014 Asian Games
Asian Games gold medalists for China
Asian Games silver medalists for China
Medalists at the 2010 Asian Games
Medalists at the 2014 Asian Games